Kozhikode East is a suburb of Kozhikode city in India.  Kozhikode East includes areas outside the city jurisdiction but they are still closely associated with the city in terms of commerce and everyday life.

Location
Kozhikode East mainly includes area covered by the Wayanad Road from Vellimadukunnu to Kunnamangalam.  The term Mavoor Road is used only for the stretch of the road from Mananchira to Calicut Medical College.  The remaining part of the road up to Mavoor village is also considered as Kozhikode East.  These two roads are connected by the Mayanad Road which forms a third constituent of Kozhikode East.

Suburbs and townships
 Koduvally, Chathamangalam, Kettangal and Kunnamangalam, Mukkam
 Vellimadukunnu, Paroppady and Cheruvatta
  Mayanad, Moozhikkal and Mavoor.
 Arambram, Chennamangallur and Eranchiparamb, Koolimadu
     Karassery, Kattangal and Koduvally
     Kumaranallur , Manashery, Moozhikkal, Kodiyathur
        Palangad, Pazhur, Cheruvadi  and Peringolam
     Perumanna, Peruvayal and Poolacode
     Pottassery and Thazhecode

The Kovoor Walk
On both sides of the national highway in Kovoor Town you can find green paddy fields filled with coconut gardens on the fringes.  There is a footpath from Kovoor Town to Iringadanpalli village which takes your further to the Vellimadukunnu Hills on the Wayanad Road.  This walk can be extended up to the Poolakkadavu river and the little foot bridge leading to Parambil Bazar town.

Chevayur Township
Chevayur is a suburban town of Kozhikode city in India. It is at a distance of 2 km from Calicut Medical College and 5 km from Kozhikode city. Chevayur is near other important residential locations like Chevarambalam, Kovoor Town and Thondayad Junction. On the southern side, Chevayur is connected by SBI Colony Road and Gas Godown Road to Palazhi and Nellikkunnu areas.  On the northern side, Chevarambalam road and Iringadanpalli Road connects Chevayur with Vellimadukunnu area on the Wayanad road.

Important organizations
 Indian Institute of Management, Kunnamangalam.  
 National Institute of Technology, Chathamangalam.
SNES Institute of Management Studies And Research (IMSAR)
 KMCT Engineering College 
 KMCT Medical College 
 National Institute of Electronics and Information Technology
 The Centre for Water Resources Development and Management 
 Markaz, Karanthur 
 Indian Institute of Spices Research
 Kozhikode Medical College
ICAR - Indian Institute of Spices Research,

Other landmarks

 Hara Hara Mahadheva Temple, Karanthur
 Kerala School of Mathematics
 Dayapuram Educational and Cultural Centre
 Auxilium Navajyoti Higher Secondary School
 MES Raja Residential School
 Indian Theosophical society
 Water Resource Museum, Peringalam.
 St. Joseph Devagiri College.

Mavoor Road after Medical College
The term Mavoor Road is used only for the 8.3 km stretch of road between Mananchira and Calicut Medical College.  The road goes another 13 kam and ends in Mavoor town.  This second stretch of Mavoor town has many important towns and villages like: 
 Peruvayal
 Perumanna
 Mavoor

Location

See also
 Kozhikode city
 Kovoor Town
 Kuttikkattoor
 Devagiri
 Calicut Medical College
 Chevayur
 Silver Hills

Image gallery

References

Suburbs of Kozhikode